Richard J. Leon (born December 3, 1949) is a Senior United States district judge of the United States District Court for the District of Columbia.

Early life and education
Leon was born in South Natick, Massachusetts, in 1949. He is the son of Silvano B. Leon and Rita M. Leon, née O'Rorke. His paternal grandparents were immigrants from Portugal who settled in Framingham, Massachusetts.  He received his Bachelor of Arts degree from College of the Holy Cross in 1971, where he played varsity lacrosse and was a classmate of future Supreme Court Associate Justice Clarence Thomas. He received his Juris Doctor from Suffolk University Law School in 1974.

Legal career
Leon served as a law clerk to the justices of the Massachusetts Superior Court from 1974 to 1975 and to Thomas F. Kelleher of the Rhode Island Supreme Court from 1975 to 1976. Leon was an attorney for the Immigration and Naturalization Service of the United States Department of Justice from 1976 to 1977 and a Special Assistant United States Attorney in the office of the United States Attorney for the Southern District of New York working in the Civil Division from 1977 to 1978.

Leon received his Master of Laws from Harvard Law School in 1981.

Leon was an assistant professor of law at St. John's University School of Law from 1979 to 1983 and a senior trial attorney in the United States Department of Justice from 1983 to 1987. Leon served as deputy chief minority counsel on the Select Committee to Investigate Covert Arms Transactions with Iran of the United States House of Representatives, which investigated the Iran-Contra affair, from 1987 to 1988.

Leon was appointed Deputy Assistant Attorney General and served from 1988 to 1989, when he entered private practice in Washington, D.C., first with Baker & Hostetler from 1989 to 1999 and then with Vorys, Sater, Seymour and Pease from 1999 to 2002, when he was appointed to the district court.

Leon was a member of the President's Commission on White House Fellowships from 1990 to 1993. Leon was appointed chief minority counsel on the October Surprise Task Force of the House Foreign Affairs Committee from 1992 to 1993. He served as special counsel to the House Financial Services Committee in 1994. He is an adjunct professor at The George Washington University Law School and the Georgetown University Law Center.

Federal judicial service
Leon was nominated to the United States District Court for the District of Columbia by George W. Bush on September 10, 2001, to the seat vacated by Norma Holloway Johnson. Confirmed by the Senate on  February 14, 2002, he received his judicial commission five days later. He assumed senior status on December 31, 2016.

Guantanamo Bay
Leon was responsible for adjudicating the habeas corpus petitions of several dozen captives held at the Guantanamo Bay detention camp.
Boumediene v. Bush, which was eventually considered by the Supreme Court, was first heard by Leon. By August 28, 2008, Leon had 24 cases assigned to him.

The Associated Press reported Leon hoped to resolve those cases before the presidential inauguration in 2009 and was concerned that the public and the detainees will be barred from observing the hearings: "If it can't be done, I have great concern that these hearings will be virtually or exclusively classified, closed to the public and, I might add, to the detainees."

During a hearing on October 23, 2008, Leon commented on the ambiguity of the term "enemy combatant" and criticized Congress and the Supreme Court: "We are here today, much to my dismay, I might add, to deal with a legal question that in my judgment should have been resolved a long time ago. I don't understand, I really don't, how the Supreme Court made the decision it made and left that question open... I don't understand how the Congress could let it go this long without resolving." On November 20, Leon ordered five detainees released from Guantanamo Bay Naval Base due to insufficient evidence.

In December 2008, Leon denied Moath Hamza Ahmed al Alawi's habeas corpus petition, finding the enemy combatant's detention was lawful under the Authorization for Use of Military Force of 2001. In February 2017, Leon denied another habeas corpus petition from al Alawi, rejecting the detainee's claim that the war's hostilities had ceased.

NSA metadata collection unconstitutional 
On December 16, 2013, Leon ruled that the NSA's bulk collection of Americans' telephony records likely violated the Fourth Amendment to the United States Constitution, though he stayed enforcement of his injunction pending appeal to the D.C. Circuit. Excerpts from his decision are as follows:

Other notable cases
In January 2010, Leon preliminarily enjoined the Food and Drug Administration from blocking the importation of electronic cigarettes.

In 2010 he threw out the charges in an obscenity case against director John Stagliano: "I hope the government will learn a lesson from its experience", calling the Justice Department's prosecution "woefully insufficient".

On November 7, 2011, Leon issued a preliminary injunction against the U.S. Food and Drug Administration for ordering graphic images on cigarette packs.  On February 29, 2012, Leon's final ruling held that the graphic images and statements violated the commercial right to free speech.

On September 1, 2011, Leon approved Assistant Attorney General Christine A. Varney's agreement allowing the acquisition of NBC Universal by Comcast.

On January 2, 2013, Leon ruled that a memo linking the Palestinian Authority (PA) to a suicide bombing that killed two American teenagers and one Israeli teen be returned to the PA or destroyed.  The memo had been inadvertently turned over to attorneys for the families of the victims in a lawsuit over the killings.  In a motion for a stay of Leon's order, lawyers for the plaintiffs said if they returned or destroyed the memo, "this critically important evidence of murder will likely be lost forever."

On May 17, 2016, Judge Leon ruled the Washington, DC handgun carry unconstitutional. He struck down the District requirement that an applicant show "good reason" before a concealed carry permit would be issued.

In August 2016 Leon issued a controversial stay concerning a long delayed light rail transit project in the suburban counties Maryland surrounding the District of Columbia called the Purple Line (Maryland) that required an additional Environmental Impact Statement for the project.  Larry Hogan, the Governor of Maryland, cited a potential conflict of interest in Judge Leon's rulings based on his close relationship with the Columbia Country Club that is affected by the transit project's route.

On January 4, 2018, Leon denied a request by Fusion GPS to block the House Intelligence Committee from demanding bank records of 70 of the private investigative firm's transactions with law firms, journalists and contractors, ruling that the request "did not violate the company's First Amendment rights" to political speech and association.

On June 12, 2018, Leon rejected all of Assistant Attorney General Makan Delrahim's claims and refused to block the $85.4 billion merger of AT&T and Time Warner.

On September 24, 2018, Leon dismissed the Electronic Frontier Foundation's constitutional challenge against the Stop Enabling Sex Traffickers Act (SESTA) in the case Woodhull Freedom Foundation, et al. v. U.S. based on lack of standing without ruling on the merits of the case. On appeal, the United States Court of Appeals for the District of Columbia Circuit reversed Leon's dismissal and remanded the case back for proceedings on the merits.

On November 29, 2018, Leon raised concerns surrounding the recent close of a $68 billion merger between CVS Health and Aetna Inc. after learning CVS closed its acquisition before obtaining court approval of an antitrust settlement the companies reached with the government. In expressing skepticism over the merger, Leon cited opposition from the American Medical Association (AMA), which previously warned that the deal would lead to higher premium and out-of-pocket costs for patients purchasing drugs, as well as reduce the quality of health insurance. Leon chided the companies and the Justice Department for treating him like a “rubber stamp," complaining he was “being kept in the dark” about the closing of the merger.

On February 15, 2019, Leon dismissed a lawsuit brought by the North American Butterfly Association against the Department of Homeland Security (DHS) seeking to prevent the building of a border wall through its National Butterfly Center, a 100-acre wildlife preserve in the Rio Grande Valley in Texas. He said the Fourth Amendment against unreasonable searches and seizures "offers little refuge for unenclosed land near one of the country’s external borders" and that environmental review had been properly waived by the DHS.

On July 19, 2019, Leon upheld the Trump administration's health insurance expansion that allowed companies to offer additional plans that do not meet the coverage requirements of the Affordable Care Act. Judge Leon rejected the claim by the Association for Community Affiliated Plans that the move to authorize short-term coverage plans was a violation of the Administrative Procedure Act, and granted summary judgement to the government. The insurance companies plan to appeal.

On December 30, 2019, the subject dismissed Charles M. Kupperman v United States House of Representatives, et al., a case, briefly, at the center of both the Trump–Ukraine scandal and the impeachment proceedings against President Donald Trump which became moot due to the subpoenas being withdrawn.

See also
 Timeline of investigations into Trump and Russia (2018) (disambiguation)
 Timeline of investigations into Trump and Russia (2019)

References

External links

1949 births
21st-century American judges
20th-century American lawyers
College of the Holy Cross alumni
Georgetown University Law Center faculty
St. John's University (New York City) faculty
United States Department of Justice lawyers
Harvard Law School alumni
Judges of the United States District Court for the District of Columbia
Judges presiding over Guantanamo habeas petitions
Living people
Suffolk University Law School alumni
United States district court judges appointed by George W. Bush
Assistant United States Attorneys
People from Natick, Massachusetts
American people of Portuguese descent
George Washington University Law School faculty
People associated with BakerHostetler